The following lists events that happened in 2011 in Zimbabwe.

Incumbents
 President: Robert Mugabe 
 Prime Minister: Morgan Tsvangirai 
 First Vice President: Joice Mujuru
 Second Vice President: John Nkomo

Events

August

 2 August - On the urging of Sharon Pincott from the Presidential Elephant Conservation project, Minister Francis Nhema on behalf of President Robert Mugabe reaffirms the 1990 Presidential Decree which is supposed to specially protect the Presidential Elephants of Zimbabwe in Hwange

Deaths

October
12 October: Takunda Mafika, musician and teacher (b. 1983)

References

 
2010s in Zimbabwe
Zimbabwe
Zimbabwe
Years of the 21st century in Zimbabwe